The Muppets are puppet characters created by Jim Henson.

Muppet may also refer to:

The Muppets (franchise), the media franchise, created by Jim Henson in 1976 which started in the television series
The Muppets Studio:
The Muppet Show, the first television series featuring the Muppets
The Muppets (film), a 2011 film about the Muppets
The Muppets (TV series), the 2015 television series about the Muppets
The Muppets of Sesame Street
Muppets (EP), an EP by Less Than Jake
"Muppet", a 2010 single by Grasscut

See also